Streptomyces bryophytorum is a bacterium species from the genus of Streptomyces which has been isolated from moss from Wuchang in China.

See also 
 List of Streptomyces species

References 

 

bryophytorum
Bacteria described in 2016